Hacks ( Sink or Swim and The Big Twist) is a 1997 American comedy film written and directed by Gary Rosen. The film premiered at the AFI Los Angeles Film Festival.

Plot

Brian is a television writer-producer who is working on creating a 22-episode show, but has writer's block and needs inspiration.  He teams up with a group of writer friends to write about a sexual encounter he watches on a balcony.

He witnesses a strange romantic encounter between two figures on the balcony of a hotel near his flat and decides to write scripts with his writer friends based on what he saw.

Cast
 Stephen Rea as Brian
 Illeana Douglas as Georgia Feckler
 John Ritter as Hank
 Dave Foley as Neil
 Richard Kind as Benny
 Dusty Kay as Ira Gold
 Tom Arnold as Danny
 Robert Patrick as Goatee
 Ryan O'Neal as Dr. Applefield
 Jason Priestley as The Dude
 Olivia d'Abo as Lynn
 Lisa Kudrow as Reading
 Bob Odenkirk as Cell

Reception
Leonard Klady of Variety magazine called it "a flip, intermittently amusing satire" and praised the cast but wrote: "the picture has little to offer in the way of insight or reflection and therefore won't translate outside of a small, insider crowd."

References

External links
 
 
 

1997 films
1997 comedy films
American comedy films
Films set in California
American independent films
Films scored by Anthony Marinelli
1997 independent films
Films about screenwriters
Films about Hollywood, Los Angeles
1990s English-language films
1990s American films
English-language comedy films